Shakespeare's Shitstorm (stylized as #ShakespearesShitstorm) is a 2020 American musical comedy horror film written and directed by Lloyd Kaufman. Produced by Troma Entertainment, it is a contemporary parody of William Shakespeare's The Tempest.

Plot
After being betrayed by his treacherous sister Antoinette and pharmaceutical big shot Big Al, scientist Prospero Duke swears revenge.

Cast
 Lloyd Kaufman as Prospero Duke / Antoinette Duke
 Erin Miller as Ferdinand
 Kate McGarrigle as Miranda Duke
 Abraham Sparrow as Big Al
 Debbie Rochon as Senator Sebastian
 Amanda Flowers as Ariel
 Dylan Greenberg as Trini
 Monique Dupree as Caliban
 Teresa Hui as Chien Wu Bang
 Zac Amico as Lindy West
 Bjarni Gautur as The Captain
 Mala Wright as Sycorax
 Vada Callisto as Puck
 Julie Anne Prescott as Hippolyta
 Frazer Brown as William Shakespeare
 Brandon Bassham as Francis Bacon

Reception
A reviewer for Consequence remarked that the film delivered the cheap look, dumb jokes and gross-out imagery which appeals to those with the taste of teenagers and for which Troma is known. A reviewer for Dread Central said that the film provided horrible puns, disgusting gags and family fun.

References

External links

 

2020 films
American comedy horror films
Films based on The Tempest
Films directed by Lloyd Kaufman
LGBT-related comedy horror films
Modern adaptations of works by William Shakespeare
Teensploitation
2020s English-language films
Troma Entertainment films
2020s American films